Michael Allen Pasana Hrabak (born August 27, 1979) is a Filipino-Turkish former professional basketball player. He last played  for the Rain or Shine Elasto Painters of the Philippine Basketball Association. He was drafted second overall by Shell in 2001.

Player Profile
A 6-foot-7 forward, Hrabak is an excellent three point shooter. He is also a very excellent interior defender and a versatile scorer. He once scored 17 points in just one quarter in a game against the Talk 'N Text Phone Pals. In the 2007-08 PBA season, he led the league in three point field goal percentage. In 2009, he was again traded to his fourth team, Rain or Shine.

References

External links
Player Profile

1979 births
Living people
Barako Bull Energy Boosters players
Basketball players from Pampanga
Central Arizona Vaqueros men's basketball players
Filipino men's basketball players
Filipino people of Turkish descent
Magnolia Hotshots players
Power forwards (basketball)
Rain or Shine Elasto Painters players
Shell Turbo Chargers players
Small forwards
Sportspeople from Angeles City
Shell Turbo Chargers draft picks